The Three Villages refers to the Maltese villages of Attard, Balzan, and Lija, which are around the centre of the island. The Three Villages are known as such because of their close proximity to one another. In some cases one side of the street is part of one village while the opposite side of the same street is part of another village.

The three villages are also very similar in size, layout and age.

History 
During the Order of St. John the three villages were sought after for country residences and hunting lodges, of which many built there large palaces as a symbol of nobility and to some extent even superiority over the rest of Maltese society.

Demographics 
From 1993 to 2014 the population of Attard and Lija increased whilst Balzan's population decreased and grew in age.

See also 
 Three Cities

References

°